The 1972 McNeese State Cowboys football team was an American football team that represented McNeese State University as a member of the Southland Conference (Southland) during the 1972 NCAA College Division football season. In their third year under head coach Jack Doland, the team compiled an overall record of 8–3 with a mark of 3–2 in conference play, and finished tied for third in the Southland.

Schedule

References

McNeese State
McNeese Cowboys football seasons
McNeese State Cowboys football